Ivan Dawson, CBE was a British Virgin Islands politician.

Subsequent to the restoration of the Legislative Council of the British Virgin Islands in 1950, Dawson was elected as member for the Third District following general elections in 1957, 1960 and 1963. He was then elected as the member for the Second District in the 1967 general election, which introduced Ministerial rule in the British Virgin Islands, and he was appointed Minister for Natural Resources and Public Health. He later served as Deputy Speaker (1971-1975) and then Speaker (1975-1983) to the Legislative Council.

He was a founding member of the United Party. The Ivan Dawson Primary School and the Ivan Dawson Memorial Scholarship are named in his honour.

Electoral history

Sources
 BVI election and information results 1950-2011

United Party (British Virgin Islands) politicians
British Virgin Islands politicians
Commanders of the Order of the British Empire